, also known by the abbreviation IkePara, is a teen romantic-comedy Japanese television drama planned by Hiroyuki Gotō for Fuji TV and Kyodo TV, based on the shōjo comic series of the same title by Hisaya Nakajo. Filming locations include Ryutsu Keizai University. It premiered on Fuji TV on July 3, 2007, and concluded with its twelfth episode on September 18 the same year.

In addition, a television special with the regular cast reprising their roles was subsequently produced, and was broadcast on October 12, 2008.

A remake of this drama with an entirely different cast was broadcast on Fuji TV during the 2011 summer season.

Cast

Episode list

Special 

A television special with the regular cast reprising their roles was subsequently produced, and was broadcast on October 12, 2008.

The story starts off half a year after Mizuki's secret of being a girl has revealed. It is near Valentine's Day, and Sano and Nakatsu are talking about the last week of summer vacation. The story then flashes back to the last week of summer holidays, which is between episodes seven and eight.

The shooting started on March 19, 2008. A conference was held on September 18, 2008, announcing the completion of the special, subtitled .

Differences 

There are many differences between the comic series and the television drama. Though the concept and characters are the same, the story is described differently. For example, in the comics Sano became injured from saving his friend, while in the drama he became injured from saving Mizuki. Genders are also different in the drama. Akiha is male in the comics, but portrayed as female in the drama. In the comes, Sano found out Mizuki's true gender when he accidentally "felt her up", but in the drama Sano finds out Mizuki is female when he overhears Mizuki talking to her brother. Nakatsu also finds out about Mizuki's gender a lot earlier in the drama, while in the comics he finds out Mizuki's true gender along with everyone else.

Music

Music from the original television soundtrack 

Peach [Performed by: Ai Otsuka]
Ikenai Taiyō [Performed by: Orange Range]
IKEMEN Boogie
Men of Paradise
St. BLOSSOM
Go to School!
HA.NA.ZA Carnival
Save Me
Early Summer
IKE-MEN 2007
I can't tell you why
Boyz be ambitious!
Beautiful Enough
Into a Nap
Be Silent
OSAKA♂Boyz
IKEMEN Boogie Nights
I am Lady
I can't tell you why (reprise)
Emergency
Sand Time
Is This Spiritual
Trap Happy
PEACH (IKEMEN☆instrumental version)

Insert songs 

 "My Love" by Kawashima Ai
 "Boom Boom Boom" by Go Hiromi (not present in the TVB broadcast of the series)
 "Paradise Ginga" by Hikaru Genji
 "Tomaranai Hāha" by Yazawa Eikichi
 "Girlfriend" by Avril Lavigne
 ( by Otsuka Ai played alternatively in the TVB broadcast of the series)
 "Oh My Julia" by the Checkers

International broadcasts

Philippines

Air date: March 24 to April 25, 2008
Broadcast network: GMA Network
Theme song: "Peach" by Ai Otsuka

Hong Kong

Air date: May 4 to July 27, 2008 (original broadcast) , June 6 2009 to October 11 2009 (rerun+ special)
Broadcast network: TVB Jade

China

Air date: January 16 to January 26, 2009
Broadcast network: Xing Kong

Indonesia

Air date: June 18 to July 15, 2011
Broadcast network: Indosiar

Malaysia

Air date: October 2008 to January 2009
Broadcast network: 8TV

See also 

 Hanazakari no Kimitachi e (2011 TV series), the 2011 Japanese remake

References

External links 

 Hanazakari no Kimitachi e reviews  at ReviewAsia
 

2007 Japanese television series debuts
2007 Japanese television series endings
Japanese drama television series
Japanese television dramas based on manga